Jerry Junior Wiltshire (born 4 February 1996) is a British Virgin Islands footballer who plays as a defender for Hayes & Yeading United.

Career
Wiltshire attended Whitmore High School and West Herts College before joining Bethel University in Tennessee, where he scored twice in 18 games. He played club soccer for Memphis City and Chattanooga before returning to college soccer at the University of West Florida in 2018. He also played for Peachtree City MOBA and Des Moines Menace before returning to England to sign for Maidenhead United after a successful trial in September 2020. He left the Magpies at the end of the season after one goal in 15 appearances. Wiltshire joined Walton Casuals in November 2021. In July 2022, Wiltshire joined Hayes & Yeading United.

International career
Wiltshire scored on his international debut for the British Virgin Islands in a 2–2 draw with the Turks and Caicos Islands.

Career statistics

Club

Notes

International

.

International goals
Scores and results list the British Virgin Islands' goal tally first.

References

External links
 Jerry Wiltshire at Bethel University
 Jerry Wiltshire at the University of West Florida

1996 births
Living people
English footballers
British Virgin Islands footballers
British Virgin Islands international footballers
Association football defenders
USL League Two players
National League (English football) players
Southern Football League players
Memphis City FC players
Chattanooga FC players
Peachtree City MOBA players
Des Moines Menace players
Maidenhead United F.C. players
Walton Casuals F.C. players
Hayes & Yeading United F.C. players
People of British Virgin Islands descent
Expatriate soccer players in the United States
West Florida Argonauts men's soccer players
Bethel Wildcats men's soccer players